Álvaro Jaime Mones Sibillotte (born 7 August 1942 in Montevideo) is a Uruguayan biologist and paleontologist.

The fossil Josephoartigasia monesi is named after him, for his study of the rodent in 1966.

References

1942 births
People from Montevideo
Uruguayan biologists
Uruguayan paleontologists
Living people